| guernsey = 40
| years1 = 2018–
| club1 = 
| games_goals1 = 13 (2)
| statsend = 2019
| careerhighlights =
}}

Jacob Heron (born 10 December 1999) was a professional Australian rules footballer who played for the Gold Coast Football Club in the Australian Football League (AFL).

Early life
Heron was raised in Cairns, Queensland and attended St Augustine's College. He grew up playing his junior football for the Cairns Saints in the AFL Cairns competition. Towards the end of his junior football, he relocated to the Gold Coast and began playing for Palm Beach Currumbin as well as attending Palm Beach Currumbin High School.

AFL career
Heron was named to make his AFL debut in round 9 of the 2018 AFL season against Port Adelaide in China. Should he play, he will become the first player to make his AFL debut in a game played outside of Australia.

References

External links

 

1999 births
Living people
Gold Coast Football Club players
Australian rules footballers from Queensland